N-bomb may refer to:

 Neutron bomb
 Nuclear weapon
 N-word (euphemisms)
 2C-I-NBOMe (psychedelic drug)